Apollo-Optik is a German optics company focusing on retail eyewear.

It was founded 1972 in Schwabach and is operating in 40 countries. It is the biggest optics company in Europe.

References

External links 

 https://www.apollo.de/

Eyewear retailers in Germany
Companies based in Bavaria
Eyewear companies of Germany
Retail companies established in 1972